Consorts of Montenegro were women married to the Montenegrin monarchs during their reigns. All monarchs of Montenegro were male with the title of King of Montenegro and before that Prince of Montenegro, and even earlier  Prince-Bishop of Montenegro; while all Montenegrin consorts were women with the title of Queen of Montenegro and style Majesty and before that title Princess of Montenegro and style Royal Highness. There were no wives of the Prince-Bishops as the Prince-Bishops could not marry by law.

Consorts of Montenegro 
The following women were spouses of the monarchs of Montenegro between 1852 and 1918:

Princess of Montenegro

Queen of Montenegro

References

 
Rulers of Montenegro 
Montenegro, Queen Consorts of
Montenegro, Princess Consorts of
Montenegro, List of royal consorts of
Royal consorts
Royal consorts